In the old Spanish law of Aragon, an excrex was a gift from the groom to the bride at marriage.

References

Law of Spain
Wedding objects
Marriage in Spain